Vladimir Kragić (8 June 1910 – 17 September 1975) was a Yugoslav footballer.

Club career
Born in Split, Kragić spent his entire career playing for his hometown club Hajduk Split, for whom he appeared in a total of 354 matches and scored 266 goals in the period between 1929 and 1939.

Although he played as a left back in the early days of his career, he later proved to be a very successful goalscorer once he changed position to left winger and forward in the 1930s and was top scorer in the 1932–33 Yugoslav First League season with 21 goals.

International career
Kragić was also capped six times for the Kingdom of Yugoslavia national team. His international debut came on 4 May 1930 in a friendly against Romania and his last appearance was on 29 April 1934 against the same opponent in a 1934 World Cup qualifier.

References

External links
 
Vladimir Kragić at the Serbia national football team website 

1910 births
1975 deaths
Footballers from Split, Croatia
Yugoslav footballers
Yugoslavia international footballers
Association football wingers
Association football fullbacks
HNK Hajduk Split players
Yugoslav First League players
Burials at Lovrinac Cemetery